× Arctodupontia is a nothogenus of Arctic and Subarctic plants in the grass family. The only known nothospecies is × Arctodupontia scleroclada, found in the colder regions of Eurasia and North America (Nunavut, Svalbard, Magadan, northern European Russia). It is believed to have originated as a hybrid of two other arctic grasses: Arctophila fulva × Dupontia fisheri.

References

Pooideae
Monotypic Poaceae genera
Plant nothogenera